The Romanian Treasure is a collection of valuable objects and the gold reserves (~120 tonnes) of the Romanian government sent to Russia for safekeeping during World War I. After the Romanian Army entered Bessarabia, at the time part of the Russian Empire, in early 1918, the new Soviet government that managed to rule Russia severed all diplomatic relations and confiscated the Romanian Treasure. As of today, only part of the objects and none of the gold reserves have been returned.

Historical background

During World War I, since Bucharest was occupied by the Central Powers, the Romanian administration moved to Iaşi, and with them, the most valuable objects which belonged to the Romanian state. Fearing an eventual victory of the Central Powers, the Romanian government decided to send the Treasure abroad.

Among the ideas considered was to send it for safekeeping to the vaults of the Bank of England or even to send it to the United States, but there was the problem of transportation, since Germany and its allies controlled most of Central Europe and sending it via Northern Europe was dangerous, as the Germans could have intercepted it.

The decision had to be taken by the Romanian Prime Minister Ion I. C. Brătianu. Although the banker Mauriciu Blank advised him to send it to London or to a neutral country, such as Denmark, Brătianu feared the German submarines of the North Sea and chose another ally of Romania in World War I, the Russian Empire, using the argument that "Russia would feel offended if we sent it to England".

As a side note, during World War II, the valuables of the National Bank of Romania were not transported outside of Romania, but hidden inside a cave near Tismana, Gorj County, and from there, they were safely recovered after the war.

Sending the Treasure

The Romanian government signed a deal with the Russian government which stated that Russia would safe keep the Romanian Treasure in the Kremlin until the end of the war.

At 3:00 AM on December 15, 1916, a train with 21 carriages, full of gold bars and gold coins (around 120 tonnes), departed the Iaşi train station eastward. In four other carriages, two hundred gendarmes guarded the train. The gold load of this train had  a value of $5 billion.

Seven months later, in the summer of 1917, as the war situation was getting worse for Romania, another transport was sent to Moscow, containing the most precious objects of the Romanian state, including the archives of the Romanian Academy, many antique valuables, such as 3,500-year-old golden jewels found in Romania, ancient Dacian jewels, the jewels of the voivodes of Wallachia and Moldavia, as well as the jewels of the Romanian royalty, thousands of paintings, as well as precious religious objects owned by Romanian monasteries, such as 14th century icons and old Romanian manuscripts. It also contained various deposits of the Romanian people at the national banks. The value of this train is hard to estimate, especially because most of its contents are art objects.

Soviet Russia and Soviet Union
After the Romanian Army entered Bessarabia, at the time nominally part of Russia, in early 1918, the new Soviet government severed all diplomatic relations and confiscated the Romanian treasure. The Romanian government tried to recover the treasure in 1922, but with little success. In 1935, the USSR did return a part of the archives, and in 1956 paintings and ancient objects, most notably, the Pietroasele Treasure.

All the governments of Romania since World War I, regardless of their political colour, have tried unsuccessfully to negotiate a return of the gold and of the culturally valuable objects, but all Soviet and Russian governments have refused. The Soviet Union tried to use the treasure in the dispute over Bessarabia, but no agreement was reached.

The Treasure since 1917

Very little is known about the Treasure after the October Revolution, but it appears that during World War II all the valuables held by the Soviet state (and presumably of the Romanian state) were taken out from Moscow and sent toward the regions which were 'not endangered'. However, it is clear that they were not kept sealed, as the agreement with the Romanian government said, as the chests of the archives which were returned in 1935 had obviously been rummaged through and many objects and documents were missing.

Recent negotiations

After the fall of the Soviet Union, the Russian governments' position toward the Romanian Treasure remained the same and various negotiations failed. The Romanian–Russian treaty of 2003 did not mention the Treasure; presidents Ion Iliescu and Vladimir Putin decided to create a commission to analyze this problem, but no advances were made.

See also
 Baldin Collection
 Moscow gold
 Nazi gold
 Romania–Russia relations

References
  "Am fi naivi sa credem ca il returneaza", 19.04.2022
  Irina Cristea, "Tezaur - Se reiau negocierile", Jurnalul Naţional, 22 July 2005
  Camelia Muntean,  "Comoara României rămâne îngropată la Moscova", Jurnalul Naţional, May 20, 2005
  Nicolae Titulescu, "Cum am încercat să salvez tezaurul"
   Andreea Tutunaru, "Tezaurul Romaniei la Moscova"

Foreign relations of Romania
Romania–Soviet Union relations
Romania–Russia relations
Romania in World War I
Art and cultural repatriation after World War II
Archaeology of Romania